Nastasen was a king of Kush (335 – 315/310 BC). According to a stela from Dongola his mother was named Queen Pelkha and his father may have been King Harsiotef. His successor was Aryamani.

He is known from three types of objects. There is a stela with a long historical inscription, a silver handle of a mirror and several shabti-figures. The mirror handle and the shabti were found in a pyramid at Nuri (Nu. 15), which was obviously his burial place. He was the last Kushite king to be buried in the royal cemetery at Napata.

The 1.63 m high granite stela was found at New Dongola and is now in the Berlin Museum Inv. no. 2268. Originally it was most likely placed in the Amun temple of Jebel Barkal. In the upper part appear the pictures and name of his mother, Pelkha and his wife, Sekhmakh, next to the king.

The tomb of Nastasen is among several in Nuri that are slated for excavation by archaeologists using underwater archaeological methods. That is necessary because of rising ground waters in what was the Nubian region of Ancient Egypt. These tombs are under the pyramids and have flooded. Initial excavation reports of his tomb indicate that, essentially, it may be undisturbed by robbers. Expectations exist that artifacts not adversely affected by the water, will be found so more will be known about Nastasen from what is discovered along with tantalizing evidence already found, of artifacts mostly damaged or lost due to the action of the water.

During his reign, Nastasen defeated an invasion of Kush from Upper Egypt. Nastasen's monument calls the leader of this invasion Kambasuten, a likely local variation of Khabbash. Khabbash was a local ruler of Upper Egypt who had campaigned against the Persians around 338 BC. His invasion of Kush was a failure, and Nastasen claimed to have taken many fine boats and other booty during his victory.

References

Literature

Laszlo Török, in: Fontes Historiae Nubiorum, Vol. II, Bergen 1996, 467-501,

External links
The hieroglyphic text of the stela
Homestead Nastasen Stela
4th-century BC monarchs of Kush
4th-century BC rulers